Membership of the Royal Colleges of Physicians of the United Kingdom (MRCP(UK)) is a postgraduate medical diploma in the United Kingdom (UK). The examinations are run by the Federation of the Medical Royal Colleges – the Royal College of Physicians of London, the Royal College of Physicians of Edinburgh, and the Royal College of Physicians and Surgeons of Glasgow. The three Royal Colleges of Physicians share this common three part assessment in general medicine which consists of two written parts and one clinical examination. Examinations are held throughout the UK and in overseas centres.

Holders of the MRCP(UK) can subscribe as "collegiate members" to any or all of the three UK Royal Colleges of Physicians. Thus the MRCP(UK) qualification has replaced the former MRCP(Lon), MRCP(E), and MRCP(G) qualifications. (Similarly, the MRCS is also now intercollegiate.)

There is a separate MRCPI qualification, run by the Royal College of Physicians of Ireland, based in Dublin in the Republic of Ireland.

History
The three Royal Colleges of Physicians have been holding membership examinations for many years. In the London College the Censors, helped by other examiners, had the duty to carry out the assessment of candidates and advise the College. The MRCP (London) examination began in 1859 with a numerical marking system devised in 1893. In the late 1960s the need to have a single recognized membership examination throughout the United Kingdom was recognized. Such an examination made it unnecessary for junior doctors to enter several membership examinations and removed the suggestion that the standards of the examination at the three Colleges were different.

Aims and content
The exam incorporates both examination of the candidate's knowledge of basic medical sciences as well as testing the clinical skills required for the diagnosis and management of disease. Changes to the exam in recent years have put more emphasis on communication skills and professionalism. Obtaining the "MRCP(UK)" is a prerequisite to anyone wishing to go on to a specialist training post as a Physician in the United Kingdom. Various companies, including the Royal Colleges themselves, have developed preparatory courses that focus on the nature of the questions and the required background knowledge.

In partnership with the relevant specialist societies, the three UK Royal Colleges have set up the MRCP Specialist Examinations Unit responsible for the organization of new knowledge based assessments. The ultimate objective is to ensure that NHS consultants have demonstrated their acquisition of sufficient knowledge in their chosen specialty to practice safely and competently. This will bring the assessment of physicians in training in the UK into line with those training in North America, where most specialist trainees sit a specialist examination as a further test of excellence, usually after having acquired certification in Internal Medicine.

Parts
The MRCP exam has three parts: 
MRCP Part 1 (written paper); 
MRCP Part 2 (written paper); and 
MRCP Part 2 Clinical Examination (PACES).

The MRCP part 1 examination consists of multiple choice questions in the best of five format. Starting from September 2019 MRCP part 1 exam will be available in USA. 

The MRCP part 2 examination consists of multiple choice questions in the best of five format.

The MRCP PACES examination consists of a carousel with 5 stations.

 Station 1: Tests the candidate's ability to examine the respiratory system and abdomen.
 Station 2: Tests the candidate's history taking ability.
 Station 3: Tests the candidate's ability to examine the cardiovascular system and perform a neurological examination.
 Station 4: Tests the candidate's communication skills and the ability to deal with issues of medical ethics.
 Station 5: Comprises two 8-minute "integrated clinical assessments" requiring the candidate to take a focused history and examination, formulate a differential diagnosis and management plan, and communicate the plan to the patient.

Countries hosting PACES
The MRCP PACES examination is held not only in the United Kingdom, but also in many other parts of the world.  Hosting sites include Brunei, Dubai, Al Ain, Egypt, Kuwait, Oman, Qatar, India, Pakistan, Singapore, Malaysia, Malta, Hong Kong, Myanmar, Sri Lanka, Kenya and Sudan. Examination fees at centres outside the UK are significantly higher than at UK centres.

In Singapore, the MRCP(UK) and MMed are often taken together.  In Hong Kong, MRCP(UK) is taken with MHKCP intermediate examination.

Fees
At present, the examination cost is £1495 from start to finish if all parts are taken in the UK and £2390 if are taken overseas - assuming each examination is passed in a single attempt without attending any courses.
Candidates may elect to participate in any of a number of training courses, online revision websites or use mobile applications as revision aids to improve their chances of passing.

References

External links

Medical associations based in the United Kingdom
Professional titles and certifications